Nadine P. Winter (March 3, 1924 – August 26, 2011) was a community activist and a Democratic politician in Washington, D.C.

Early years

Winter was born Nadine Kinnion Poole in New Bern, North Carolina, in 1924. She was one of five children of a brick mason and a high-school dietician. Beginning at an early age, she was a community activist and helped to found Winston-Salem's first girl scout troop for black girls.

Education and community advocacy
After graduating from Atkins High School in Winston-Salem, she attended the Hampton Institute where she received a Bachelor of Arts Degree after transferring to Brooklyn College. During this time, she lived in a multi-ethnic community in Brooklyn, where she founded a store-front community service agency and worked nights to complete her education.

After moving to Washington, D.C., in 1947, Winter graduated from Cortez Peters Business School and later received a Master of Arts degree from Federal City College (now the University of the District of Columbia). Soon, Winter began to fulfill a social action and social services role in the city. She was the founder and an executive director of Hospitality House, Inc., which served numerous underprivileged citizens in the District by providing day care for youth and seniors, as well as a temporary homeless shelter. In addition, she also served as an original organizer of the National Welfare Rights Organization.

Political career
Winter was elected as one of the original members of the Council of the District of Columbia in 1974 when D.C. gained home rule. She represented Ward 6 on the council from 1975 to 1991. Winter was a presidential elector in the 1996 and 2000 presidential elections.

Personal life
Winter had two sons. Winter's husband, Reginald C. Winter Sr., died in 1973.

Death
Winter died of pneumonia in her home in Southwest, Washington, D.C. on August 26, 2011.

References

External links
 Guide to the Nadine P. Winter DC City Council Papers, circa 1976-1990, Special Collections Research Center, Estelle and Melvin Gelman Library, The George Washington University

1924 births
2011 deaths
20th-century American women politicians
Brooklyn College alumni
Deaths from pneumonia in Washington, D.C.
Members of the Council of the District of Columbia
Politicians from New Bern, North Carolina
2000 United States presidential electors
1996 United States presidential electors
University of the District of Columbia alumni
Washington, D.C., Democrats
Women city councillors in the District of Columbia
20th-century American politicians
21st-century American women